Melica virgata, is a grass species in the family Poaceae that can be found in China, Mongolia and Russia (Siberia).

Description

Ecology
It blooms from May to July.

References

virgata
Flora of Asia